Queensland Firebirds are an Australian netball team based in Brisbane, Queensland. Since 2017 they have played in Suncorp Super Netball. Between 2008 and 2016, they played in the ANZ Championship and between 1997 and 2007, they played in the Commonwealth Bank Trophy. Firebirds were the most successful team during the ANZ Championship era, playing in five grand finals and winning three premierships, in 2011, 2015 and 2016. They were the only team to win back to back ANZ Championship titles.

History

Commonwealth Bank Trophy
Between 1997 and 2007, Queensland Firebirds represented Netball Queensland in the Commonwealth Bank Trophy league. Together with Adelaide Ravens, Adelaide Thunderbirds, Melbourne Kestrels, Melbourne Phoenix, Perth Orioles, Sydney Sandpipers and Sydney Swifts, Firebirds were one of the founding members of the league. Between 2005 and 2009, Vicki Wilson, a former Australia netball international, served as Firebirds head coach. In 2006 Firebirds reached their first play-off series, losing 58–56 in the semi-finals to Melbourne Phoenix.

Regular season statistics

ANZ Championship
Between 2008 and 2016, Firebirds played in the ANZ Championship. In 2009, Roselee Jencke was appointed head coach. In 2011 Firebirds finished the season undefeated. This marked the beginning of a golden age for the team. Between 2011 and 2016, Jencke guided Firebirds to five grand finals and three premierships. They were the most successful team during the ANZ Championship era and the only team to win back to back titles. Romelda Aiken, Laura Geitz and Clare McMeniman formed the nucleus of the Firebirds squad and featured in all three Championship winning squads.

Regular season statistics

Suncorp Super Netball
Since 2017, Firebirds have played in Suncorp Super Netball. They have only participated in one year of finals, being knocked out in the minor semi-final of 2018.

Regular season statistics

Grand finals
ANZ Championship

Home venues
Firebirds have played their home games at various venues throughout Brisbane and Queensland. In February 2019, they moved into a new permanent home, the Queensland State Netball Centre.

Notable players

2023 squad

Internationals

 Karyn Bailey
 Carla Dziwoki
 Kate Shimmin
 Amorette Wild

 Tamsin Greenway
 Chelsea Pitman
 Kate Shimmin
 Eboni Usoro-Brown

 Romelda Aiken

 Ameliaranne Ekenasio

 Erin Burger 
 Ine-Mari Venter
 Lenize Potgieter

 Simone Nalatu

 Maleta Roberts

Captains

Head coaches

Main sponsors

Queensland Sapphires

Queensland Sapphires are the reserve team of Queensland Firebirds.

Premierships

ANZ Championship
Winners: 2011, 2015, 2016
Runners Up: 2013, 2014

References

External links
  Queensland Firebirds on Facebook
  Queensland Firebirds on Twitter

 
ANZ Championship teams
Commonwealth Bank Trophy teams
Fir
Sporting clubs in Brisbane
Sports clubs established in 1997
Suncorp Super Netball teams
1997 establishments in Australia
Netball teams in Queensland
Netball teams in Australia